Chase Bryant is the self-titled debut EP by American country music artist Chase Bryant. It was released on September 23, 2014 via Red Bow.

Critical reception 
Website, The Shotgun Seat gave the album a three-star review, saying that "Consistency is key, and Chase Bryant is a solid set of five songs that work perfectly together. That being said, he’s going to need more interesting subject matters on his next release. He’s no Luke Bryan or Florida Georgia Line. Judging from Chase Bryant, though, there’s promise he can be much more than that."

Track listing

Chart performance

References 

2014 debut EPs
Chase Bryant EPs
BBR Music Group EPs
Albums produced by Derek George